The Lehigh Valley Terminal was a railroad station in downtown Buffalo, New York. The Lehigh Valley Railroad opened it in 1916, replacing an older station one block east at Scott and Washington streets. Lehigh Valley trains served at the station included the Black Diamond, Maple Leaf and Star. The station handled the Lehigh Valley's passenger traffic in Buffalo until 1955, when it was demolished to make room for the Niagara Thruway (Interstate 190). The Lehigh Valley moved its operations to a smaller station outside the downtown area at Dingens and South Ogden Streets, which served until the end of all Lehigh Valley passenger service in 1961. The terminal also hosted the Erie Railroad's passenger trains from 1935 until 1951, when that railroad ceased serving Buffalo.

References 

 
 

Railway stations in the United States opened in 1916
Railway stations closed in 1955
Former Erie Railroad stations
Former Lehigh Valley Railroad stations
Demolished railway stations in the United States
Railway stations in Buffalo, New York
1916 establishments in New York (state)
1955 disestablishments in New York (state)
Buildings and structures demolished in 1955